The 2022–23 Wagner Seahawks men's basketball team represents Wagner College in the 2022–23 NCAA Division I men's basketball season. The Seahawks, led by first-year head coach Donald Copeland, play their home games at the Spiro Sports Center in Staten Island, New York as a member of the Northeast Conference.

Previous season
The Seahawks finished the 2021–22 season 21–6, 15–3 in NEC play to finish in second place. As the No. 2 seed in the NEC tournament, they defeated Saint Francis (PA) and LIU, before falling to Bryant in the championship game.

On April 12, it was announced that head coach Bashir Mason would be leaving the program to become the next head coach at Saint Peter's. On April 21, Seton Hall assistant and former Wagner assistant under Mason, Donald Copeland, was named as Mason's successor.

Roster

Schedule and results

|-
!colspan=12 style=| Non-conference regular season

|-
!colspan=12 style=| NEC regular season

|-
!colspan=9 style=| NEC tournament

Sources

References

Wagner Seahawks men's basketball seasons
Wagner Seahawks
Wagner Seahawks men's basketball team
Wagner Seahawks men's basketball team